The  was an army of the Imperial Japanese Army during World War II.

History
The Japanese 23rd Army was formed on June 26, 1941 under the Imperial General Headquarters. It was transferred to the control of the China Expeditionary Army on August 12 of the same year. It was based in Guangdong province and on Hainan Island to replace the Southern China Area Army which was disbanded June 26, 1941.

The Japanese 23rd Army was primarily a garrison force to deter the possible landings of Allied forces in southern China.  It was involved in the Battle of Guilin-Liuzhou (part of Operation Ichi-Go) from August–November 1944. The Japanese 23rd Army surrendered to the Chinese Kuomintang forces on August 15, 1945 with the surrender of Japan and was disbanded in Guangzhou.

After the war, Imamura, Sakai, and Tanaka were all tried and convicted of war crimes. Sakai and Tanaka were tried in China and executed, while Imamura received a life sentence from an Australian military court. He was released in 1954. Viewing his own sentence as too lenient, Imamura built his own prison in which he imprisoned himself until his death in 1967.

List of Commanders

Commanding officer

Chief of staff

See also
Hong Kong Defence Force (Imperial Japanese Army)

References

Books

External links

23
Military units and formations established in 1941
Military units and formations disestablished in 1945